Roberto Passarin (July 7, 1934 – April 5, 1982) was an Italian professional football player. He was born in Novara. 

In 1964, he played abroad in the Eastern Canada Professional Soccer League with Toronto Italia.

References

External links
Brief biography of Roberto Passarin 

1934 births
1982 deaths
Italian footballers
Serie A players
Novara F.C. players
Inter Milan players
U.S. Triestina Calcio 1918 players
Palermo F.C. players
Calcio Lecco 1912 players
U.S. Alessandria Calcio 1912 players
Casale F.B.C. players
Italian expatriate footballers
Expatriate soccer players in Canada
Toronto Italia players
Italian expatriate sportspeople in Canada
Eastern Canada Professional Soccer League players
Association football midfielders